Pterotracheidae is a family of medium-sized to large floating sea snails, pelagic gastropod molluscs. They are in the superfamily Pterotracheoidea along with two other similar pelagic families, the Atlantidae and the Carinariidae.

These pelagic snails are not at all closely related to the pelagic heterobranch opistobranchs such as the sea angels and sea butterflies. They are in the clade Littorinimorpha, and as such they are related to such families as the tritons (Ranellidae) and the tun shells (Tonnidae), in the clade Caenogastropoda.

According to taxonomy of the Gastropoda by Bouchet & Rocroi (2005) the family Pterotracheidae has no subfamilies.

Genera
Genera within the family Pterotracheidae include:
 Firoloida Lesueur, 1817
 Pterotrachea Forsskål, 1775
Genera brought into synonymy
 Euryops Tesch, 1906: synonym of Pterotrachea Forsskål in Niebuhr, 1775
 Firola Bruguière, 1791: synonym of Pterotrachea Forsskål in Niebuhr, 1775
 Firolella Troschel, 1855: synonym of Firoloida Lesueur, 1817
 Heterodens Bonnevie, 1920: synonym of Pterotrachea Forsskål in Niebuhr, 1775
 Tholapex di Geronimo, 1974: synonym of Firoloida Lesueur, 1817

References

 Vaught, K.C.; Tucker Abbott, R.; Boss, K.J. (1989). A classification of the living Mollusca. American Malacologists: Melbourne. . XII, 195 pp. 
 Bouchet, P., Rocroi, J.-P. (2005). Classification and nomenclator of gastropod families. Malacologia. 47(1-2): 1-397 .

External links 
 Tree of Life: Pterotracheidae
 
 Powell A. W. B., New Zealand Mollusca, William Collins Publishers Ltd, Auckland, New Zealand 1979 

 
Taxa named by Constantine Samuel Rafinesque